Selçuklu is a town and district of Konya Province in the Central Anatolia region of Turkey. Selçuklu is one of the central districts of Konya along with the districts of Karatay and Meram. According to 2000 census, population of the district is 348,329 of which 327,627 live in the urban center of Selçuklu.

Places to see 
The Konya Tropical Butterfly Garden, opened in 2015, is a major tourist attraction.

Gallery

Notes

References

External links
 District governor's official website 
 District municipality's official website 

Populated places in Konya Province
Districts of Konya Province
Selçuklu District